Vedano al Lambro is a comune (municipality) in the Province of Monza and Brianza in the Italian region Lombardy, located about  northeast of Milan.

Vedano al Lambro is popular because it is a border municipality of the motor-car racing track, where every year on September, takes place the competition well known as Gran Premio d'Italia of Formula 1 Championship.

Twin towns
Vedano al Lambro is twinned with:

  Domène, France

References

External links